29+1 is a 2017 Hong Kong drama film directed by Kearen Pang. It is an adaptation of Pang's own one-woman show, 29+1. The film stars Chrissie Chau and Joyce Cheng and follows two women who share the same birthday and are at life's crossroads as they are about to turn 30.

The film premiered at the 12th Osaka Asian Film Festival where it won the Audience Award. It was released in Hong Kong on 11 May 2017.

Cast
Chrissie Chau as Christy Lam
Joyce Cheng as Wong Tin-lok 
Babyjohn Choi as Cheung Hon-ming 
Benjamin Yeung as Tsz-ho
Elaine Jin as Elaine
Jan Lamb as Mr. Leung
Eric Kot as Taxi driver

Soundtrack

Featured songs

Awards and nominations

References

External links

2017 directorial debut films
Hong Kong films based on plays
Hong Kong drama films
2017 drama films
2010s Hong Kong films